The Burruss Correctional Training Center is a medium security level prison located in Forsyth, Georgia in Monroe County.

It opened in 1986, and consists of four buildings. The prison provides work and rehabilitation programs for general population inmates. The facility houses adult male felons and juveniles.

Famous inmates
Genarlow Wilson (2005-2007)

External links
Georgia Department of Corrections

Buildings and structures in Monroe County, Georgia
Prisons in Georgia (U.S. state)
1986 establishments in Georgia (U.S. state)